Bäck is a surname of Swedish descent, meaning "brook", "stream" (related to Old Norse bekkr).

Notable people
Notable people with this surname include:
 Axel Bäck (1987), alpine skier from Sweden
 Elmer Bäck (1981), Finnish actor
 Immanuel Bäck (1876–1939), Finnish Lutheran clergyman and politician
 Johannes Bäck (1872–1952), Finnish Lutheran clergyman and politician
 Oskar Bäck (2000), Swedish professional ice hockey forward
 Sven-Erik Bäck (1919–1994), Swedish composer of classical music

References

Swedish-language surnames
Swedish toponymic surnames